Mourad Kriouache (born 10 March 1991) is a French professional rugby league footballer who plays as a scrum-half or  for Villeneuve in the Elite One Championship.

Playing career
Kriouache has previously played for the London Skolars. He has also played for Carcassonne XIII, Toulouse Olympique Broncos in the French competition and Toulouse Olympique in the Betfred Championship.

Villeneuve XIII RLLG
On 20 Oct 2020 it was reported that he had signed for Villeneuve XIII RLLG in the Elite One Championship

International
Kriouache is a French international. He has also represented France at junior level.

Personal
His brother Hosni Kriouache is also a professional rugby league footballer.

References

External links
Toulouse Olympique profile

1991 births
Living people
AS Carcassonne players
French rugby league players
France national rugby league team players
London Skolars players
Rugby league halfbacks
Toulouse Olympique players
Villeneuve Leopards players